Wikinomics: How Mass Collaboration Changes Everything is a book by Don Tapscott and Anthony D. Williams, first published in December 2006. It explores how some companies in the early 21st century have used mass collaboration and open-source technology, such as wikis, to be successful.

The term 'Wikinomics' describes the effects of extensive collaboration and user-participation and how relationships between businesses and markets have changed as a result.

Concepts
According to Tapscott, the use of mass collaboration in a business environment in recent history can be seen as an extension of the trend in business to outsource: externalize formerly internal business functions to other business entities. The difference however is that instead of an organized business body brought into being specifically for a unique function, mass collaboration relies on free individual agents to come together and cooperate to improve a given operation or solve a problem. This kind of outsourcing is also referred to as crowdsourcing, to reflect this difference. This can be incentivized by a reward system, though it is not required.

The book also discusses seven new models of mass collaboration, including:
 Peering: For example, page 24, "Marketocracy employs a form of peering in a mutual fund that harnesses the collective intelligence of the investment community... Though not completely open source, it is an example of how meritocratic, peer-to-peer models are seeping into an industry where conventional wisdom favors the lone super-star stock advisor."
 Ideagoras: For example, page 98, linking experts with unsolved research and development problems. The company InnoCentive is a consulting group that encapsulates the idea of ideagoras.
 Prosumers: For example, page 125, where it discusses the social video game Second Life as being created by its customers. When customers are also the producers, you have the phenomenon: Prosumer.
 New Alexandrians: This idea is about the Internet and sharing knowledge.

The last chapter is written by viewers, and was opened for editing on February 5, 2007.

Central Concepts of Wikinomics in the Enterprise

According to Tapscott and Williams, these four principles are the central concepts of wikinomics in the enterprise:

Openness, which includes not only open standards and content but also financial transparency and an open attitude towards external ideas and resources;
Peering, which replaces hierarchical models with a more collaborative forum. Tapscott and Williams cite the development of Linux as the "quintessential example of peering";
Sharing, which is a less proprietary approach to (among other things) products, intellectual property, bandwidth, scientific knowledge;
Acting globally, which involves embracing globalization and ignoring "physical and geographical boundaries" at both the corporate and individual level.

Coase's Law

In the chapter The Perfect Storm, the authors give an overview of the economic effects of the kind of transactions Web 2.0 permits. According to the authors, Coase's Law (see Ronald Coase) governs the expansion of a business:
A firm will tend to expand until the cost of organizing an extra transaction within the firm become equal to the costs of carrying out the same transaction on the open market.
However, because of the changing usage patterns of Internet technologies, the cost of transactions has dropped so significantly that the authors assert that the market is better described by an inversion of Coase's Law. That is:
A firm will tend to expand until the cost of carrying out an extra transaction on the open market become equal to the costs of organizing the same transaction within the firm. Thus, the authors think that with the costs of communicating dramatically dropping, firms who do not change their current structures will perish. Companies who utilize mass collaboration will dominate their respective markets.

Reception
A review of this book in the Harvard Business Review states "like its title, the book's prose can fall into breathless hype." A review of this book in Choice recommends the book for "general readers and practitioners," but cautions that the authors "present an optimistic overview of successful collaborations and business ventures", "use unique terms (e.g., marketocracy, prosumption, knowledge commons)", should have given "more consideration [to] the darker sides of human motivation as well as groupthink and mass mediocrity", and "primarily draw on their own observations of businesses and trends for the ideas presented".

Tapscott and Williams released a followup to Wikinomics, titled Macrowikinomics: Rebooting Business and the World, on September 28, 2010.

See also

 Business Intelligence 2.0 (BI 2.0)
 Cory Doctorow
 Demand-side learning
 File sharing
 Financial crisis
 Free: The Future of a Radical Price, by Chris Anderson
 FreeBSD
 Human-based computation
 Linux
 Mutualism
 Open business
 Open-source economics
 Participatory organization
 Stigmergy
 The Cathedral and the Bazaar, an essay by Eric S. Raymond on software engineering methods
 Theory of value

References

External links
 
 Mass collaboration could change way companies operate, article in USA Today
 Website for the public to create the "unwritten chapter"
 Abstract: Don Tapscott - Wikinomics: Winning with the enterprise 2.0
 Make Room, Wikipedia: Internet-based Collaboration Could Change the Way We Do Business, February 21, 2007
 Up is down and black is white as Wikinomics changes the business world, article on PCWorld.ca
 The Cult of the Amateur, New York Times' Book Review on Andrew Keen's criticism of Web 2.0 philosophy
 A Book Review of Wikinomics
 Review by Roger Parry in Management Today August 2007
 The Guardian: "The wiki way", 5 September 2007

Videos
 2007-02-26 Don Tapscott 82 minute presentation on Wikinomics, hosted on Google Video and Internet Archive (mpeg4 and Windows Media Player)
 2007-01-25 Don Tapscott 45 minute presentation on Wikinomics, hosted by The Canadian Club. (Windows Media Player only)
 2006-11-08 Don Tapscott 3 minute preview of Wikinomics to ZDNet.

2006 non-fiction books
Business books
Works about the information economy
Wiki concepts